A network domain is an administrative grouping of multiple private computer networks or local hosts within the same infrastructure. Domains can be identified using a domain name; domains which need to be accessible from the public Internet can be assigned a globally unique name within the Domain Name System (DNS).

A domain controller is a server that automates the logins, user groups, and architecture of a domain, rather than manually coding this information on each host in the domain. It is common practice, but not required, to have the domain controller act as a DNS server. That is, it would assign names to hosts in the network based on their IP addresses.

Example
Half of the staff of Building A uses Network 1, 192.168.10.0/24. This network has the VLAN identifier of VLAN 10. The other half of the staff of Building A uses Network 2, 192.168.20.0/24. This network has the VLAN identifier of VLAN 20. All of the staff of Building B uses Network 3, 192.168.0.0/24. This has the VLAN identifier of VLAN 11.

The router R1 serves as the gateway for all three networks, and the whole infrastructure is connected physically via ethernet. Network 2 and 3 are routed through R1 and have full access to each other.

Network 1 is completely separate from the other two, and does not have access to either of them. Network 2 and 3 are therefore in the same network domain, while Network 1 is in its own network domain, albeit alone.

A network administrator can then suitably name these network domains to match the infrastructure topology.

Usage 
Use of the term "network domain" first appeared in 1965 and saw increasing usage beginning in 1985. It initially applied to the naming of radio stations based on broadcast frequency and geographic area. It entered its current usage by network theorists to describe solutions to the problems of subdividing a single homogeneous LAN and joining multiple networks, possibly constituted of different network architectures.

References 

Computer networking
Domain Name System